Connecticut Transit Stamford (CT Transit Stamford Division) is the division of Connecticut Transit for the Stamford metropolitan area. In Stamford it provides service on 18 routes around Stamford, Connecticut, with routes centered on downtown Stamford and providing local bus service to Norwalk, CT, Greenwich, CT, Darien, CT, Port Chester, NY, and express bus service to White Plains, NY.  CT Transit Stamford's service area overlaps that of the Norwalk Transit District and HARTransit in Norwalk and Greenwich, and the Bee Line Bus in Port Chester and White Plains.

Since 1979, the Hartford, New Haven, and Stamford divisions of CT Transit have been operated by First Transit.

Routes
These are the routes operated by CT Transit in the Stamford Division.

Note: Prior to 2002, CT Transit Stamford routes were identified by letters rather than numbers, just like the systems in Hartford and New Haven. Some bus stop signs outside of downtown Stamford and Greenwich still display the route letters. On Sunday, August 14, 2016, buses serving the Stamford area, with the exception of the I-Bus, were numbered 301 through 399.

Local, Express, and Commuter Connections

See also
Connecticut Transit Hartford
Connecticut Transit New Britain and Bristol
Connecticut Transit New Haven
Northeast Transportation Company

References

External links
Official website for CT Transit
I-Bus Express Route 971 Information

Bus transportation in Connecticut
Surface transportation in Greater New York
Train-related introductions in 1976
Transportation in Fairfield County, Connecticut
Transportation in Stamford, Connecticut